Events in the year 1895 in Norway.

Incumbents
Monarch: Oscar II
Prime Minister: Emil Stang, then Francis Hagerup (from 14 October)

Events
14 October – Francis Hagerup succeeded Emil Stang as Prime Minister of Norway

Popular culture

Sports

Music

Theater

Literature
Olaus Alvestad and Lars Eskeland found Voss Folk High School
The circle of poems Haugtussa by Arne Garborg is published.
The poetry collection Bersøglis- og andre Viser by Per Sivle is published.

Births

January to March
18 January – Nils Jakob Hunstad, sportsperson, businessesman, politician and military officer (died 1978).
28 January – Johannes Pettersen Løkke, politician (died 1988)
23 February – Toralv Kollin Markussen, politician (died 1973)
25 February – Johan Bernhard Hjort, judge (died 1969)
3 March – Ragnar Anton Kittil Frisch, economist and Nobel Prize laureate (died 1973)
3 March – Adolf Nilsen, rower and Olympic bronze medallist (died 1927)
27 March – Ole Peder Arvesen, engineer and mathematician (died 1991).

April to June
21 April – Gerd Grieg, actress (died 1988)
13 May – Lars Sæter, politician (died 1988)
30 May – Andreas Backer, journalist and organizational leader (died 1975).
5 June – Ingvarda Røberg, politician (died 1990)

July to September
12 July – Kirsten Flagstad, opera singer (died 1962)
26 July – Ola Fritzner, military officer (died 1983).
6 August – Paul Oskar Lindberget, politician (died 1983)
18 August – Jon Mårdalen, cross country skier (died 1977)
24 August – Lauritz Wigand-Larsen, gymnast and Olympic silver medallist (died 1951)
3 September – Erik Ørvig, sailor and Olympic gold medallist (died 1949)

October to December
3 October – Johannes Olai Olsen, politician (died 1974)
3 October – Sigvald Svendsen, politician (died 1956)
20 October – Hans Reidar Holtermann, commander of Hegra Fortress (died 1966)
12 November – Trygve Hoff, businessman, writer and editor (died 1982)
15 November – Hagbart Haakonsen, cross country skier
20 November – Fridtjof Paulsen, speed skater (died 1988)
29 November – Leif Bjorholt Burull, politician (died 1971)
13 December – Frieda Dalen, educator (died 1995).
17 December – Nils Asheim, politician (died 1966)
18 December – Einar Sverdrup, mining engineer and businessman (died 1942)
19 December – Ingeborg Refling Hagen, author and teacher (died 1989)

Full date unknown
Kristian Hansson, jurist and civil servant (died 1959)
Oskar Omdal, Norwegian Navy pilot (died 1927)
Gunnar Schjelderup, businessperson (died 1972)
Leif Welding-Olsen, naval commander, first casualty in the war between Norway and Nazi Germany (died 1940)

Deaths
6 March – Camilla Collett, writer and feminist (born 1813)
29 April – Johan Christian Collett, politician (born 1817)
28 August – Andreas Olsen Sæhlie, farmer, distillery owner and politician (b. 1832). 
24 December – Oluf Andreas Aabel, priest and writer (born 1825)

Full date unknown
Hjalmar Hjorth Boyesen, author and college professor in America (born 1848)
Knud Knudsen, linguist (born 1812)
Simon Pedersen Holmesland, politician (born 1823)
Joseph Frantz Oscar Wergeland, military officer, cartographer and skiing pioneer (born 1815)

See also

References